The Bawanur Dam is an earth-fill dam currently being constructed on the Diyala River just upstream of the town of Bawanur in Sulaymaniyah Governorate, Iraq. It will also serve to control floods and provide water for irrigation. In August 2013, the Kurdistan Regional Government signed a US$200 million contract with the Romanian firm, Hidroconstrucția, to build the dam and power station. The project is expected to be complete in 2018.

See also

 List of dams and reservoirs in Iraq
 List of power stations in Iraq

References

Dams in Iraq
Dams on the Diyala (Sirwan) River
Earth-filled dams
Dams under construction
Run-of-the-river power stations
Hydroelectric power stations in Iraq
Sulaymaniyah Governorate